USNS Vindicator (T-AGOS-3) was a United States Navy Stalwart-class modified tactical auxiliary general ocean surveillance ship that was in service from 1984 to 1993. Vindicator then served in the United States Coast Guard from 1994 to 2001 as the medium endurance cutter USCGC Vindicator (WMEC-3). From 2004 to 2020, she was in commission in the National Oceanic and Atmospheric Administration (NOAA) fleet as the oceanographic research ship NOAAS Hi'ialakai (R 334).

Construction

Vindicator was ordered on 26 September 1980. She was laid down on 14 April 1983 by the Tacoma Boatbuilding Company, at Tacoma, Washington, and was launched on 1 June 1984. Tacoma Boatbuilding delivered her to the U.S. Navy on 21 November 1984.

United States Navy service
The Navy placed the ship in non-commissioned service in the Military Sealift Command on the day of her delivery as USNS Vindicator (T-AGOS-3). Designed to collect underwater acoustical data in support of Cold War anti-submarine warfare operations using Surveillance Towed Array Sensor System (SURTASS) sonar equipment, Vindicator spent the final years of the Cold War searching for Soviet Navy submarines.

After the collapse of the Soviet Union at the end of December 1991 brought the Cold War to an end, the requirement for such search operations declined. On 30 June 1993, the Navy removed Vindicator from service and simultaneously struck her from the Naval Vessel Register and leased her to the United States Coast Guard.

United States Coast Guard service
With their own ship moored at the United States Coast Guard Yard at Curtis Bay in Baltimore, Maryland, from June to October 1993, the crew of the U.S. Coast Guard medium endurance cutter USCGC Tamaroa (WMEC-166) reported aboard Vindicator and manned her during her Coast Guard acceptance trials. Vindicator was commissioned into Coast Guard service on 20 May 1994 as the medium endurance cutter USCGC Vindicator (WMEC-3) for use in counternarcotics operations, based in Norfolk, Virginia, and serving as a "mother ship" for 38-foot (11-6-meter) pursuit boats used to intercept drug smugglers. During 1994, manned by many former crew members of the by-then-decommissioned Tamaroa, Vindicator took part in Operation Able Manner, a joint U.S. Coast Guard-U.S. Navy effort to interdict would-be Haitian migrants to the United States. She was decommissioned on 19 August 1994 and placed in reserve at the Coast Guard Yard at Curtis Bay.

After five years of inactivity, Vindicator was recommissioned on 24 August 1999. At one point, she was under evaluation to be a test ship for a Marine Molten Carbonate Fuel Cell Demonstration Module. The Coast Guard found that Vindicator and five other Stalwart-class ships the Navy had transferred were inadequate as Coast Guard cutters because of their inability to carry helicopters and low top speed, and budget limitations prevented the Coast Guard from addressing these shortfalls. Budget cuts in early 2001 resulted in termination of the lease, and she was decommissioned again on 1 May 2001 and returned to the Military Sealift Command.

National Oceanic and Atmospheric Administration service

In October 2001, Vindicator was transferred to the National Oceanic and Atmospheric Administration (NOAA). After a $4,000,000 conversion into an oceanographic research ship, she was commissioned into NOAA service on 3 September 2004 as NOAAS Hiialakai (R 334), co-sponsored by Margaret "Maggie" Awamura Inouye, the wife of United States Senator from Hawaii Daniel Inouye, and University of Hawaii Professor Emerita Isabella A. Abbott. She was decommissioned on 14 December 2020.

Capabilities
Hiialakai was equipped with multibeam sonar and echosounder equipment for underwater mapping work. She was well equipped to support both shallow- and deep-water dive projects. She was able to carry up to five small work boats for transporting divers to and from working areas, multiple dive lockers to store scientific gear and equipment, a membrane Nitrox fill system for filling dive tanks, and a three-person, double-lock decompression chamber.

Hiialakai had a wet laboratory with a scientific freezer, a dry laboratory, and a computer and electronics laboratory. On deck, she had a 46-foot (14-meter) telescoping boom with a lifting capacity of 6,600 pounds (2,994 kg) at full extension, an A-frame with a maximum safe working load of 22,000 pounds (9,979 kg), and a J-frame with a maximum safe working load of 3,500 pounds (1,588 kg). Her normal complement of boats consisted of a 29-foot (8.8-meter) boat with a 455-horsepower (339-kilowatt) diesel motor and a capacity of 10 people, a 26-foot (7.9-meter) boat with a 210-hp (157-kW) diesel motor and a capacity of 10 people, a 17-foot (5.2-meter) boat with a 90-hp (67-kW) outboard motor and a capacity of five people, and an 18-foot (5.5-meter) SOLAS-approved rescue boat with a 90-hp (67-kW) outboard motor and a capacity of seven people.

In addition to her crew of 28, Hiialakai could accommodate up to 22 scientists.

Career
Hiialakai was home-ported at Pearl Harbor, Hawaii. She operated in the Hawaiian Islands and the Pacific Insular Area, which includes American Samoa, the Commonwealth of the Northern Mariana Islands, and Guam. Her first cruise in NOAA service – to support assessment, monitoring, and mapping at Nihoa, Necker Island (also known as Mokumanamana), the French Frigate Shoals (also known as Kānemilohaʻi), the Gardner Pinnacles (also known as Pūhāhonu), Maro Reef (also known as Nalukākala), Laysan (also known as Kauō), Lisianski Island (also known as Papa‘āpoho) and the surrounding Neva Shoals, Pearl and Hermes Atoll (also known as Holoikauaua), Kure Atoll (also known as Mokupāpapa and as Ocean Island), and Midway Atoll (also known as Pihemanu Kauihelani) – began on 13 September 2004.

Hiialakai supported the research of NOAAs National Ocean Service, National Marine Sanctuaries, National Marine Fisheries Service, and Office of Oceanic and Atmospheric Research, as well as that of the United States Fish and Wildlife Service and the University of Hawaii. She conducted coral reef ecosystem mapping, bio-analysis assessments, coral reef health studies, and fish stock studies. Her coral reef mapping supported a mapping effort initiated in 2002 by the United States Coral Reef Task Force. She carried out most of her dive-intensive operations in the Northwest Hawaiian Islands, which became the Papahanaumokuakea Marine National Monument, one of the largest marine conservation areas in the world, in 2006.

In 2008, the maritime archeologists discovered on a voyage aboard this ship found what turned out to be the wreck of the 19th century whaling sail ship Two Brothers in the French Frigate Shoals.

A 2015 assessment of the American Samoa coral reefs was the ship's longest duration voyage at 103 days. The Hiialakai conducted 3,500 dives with all three of her boats during this voyage.

References

Notes

Bibliography
 Wertheim, Eric, ed. The Naval Institute Guide to Combat Fleets of the World, 15th Edition: Their Ships, Aircraft, and Systems. Annapolis, Maryland: United States Naval Institute Press, 2007. . .

External links

NavSource Online: Service Ship Photo Archive: USNS Vindicator (T-AGOS-3) USCGC Vindicator (WMEC-3) NOAA Hi'Ialakai (R-334)
NOAA Ship Hi'Ialakai

 

Stalwart-class ocean surveillance ships
Cold War auxiliary ships of the United States
Ships built by Tacoma Boatbuilding Company
1984 ships
Ships transferred from the United States Navy to the United States Coast Guard
Medium endurance cutters
Ships of the National Oceanic and Atmospheric Administration
NOAA ex-U.S. Navy Stalwart-class oceanographic research ships
Research vessels of the United States
Hawaii-related ships